Scoparia crucigera is a moth in the family Crambidae. It was described by Aleksey Maksimovich Gerasimov in 1930. It is found in Uzbekistan.

References

Moths described in 1930
Scorparia